is a Japanese football player. She plays for INAC Kobe Leonessa in the Nadeshiko League Division 1. She also plays for Japan national team.

Club career
Sakaguchi was born in Kanagawa Prefecture on June 4, 1992. After graduating from Musashigaoka College, she joined L.League club Albirex Niigata in 2013.

National team career
In April 2018, Sakaguchi was selected Japan national team for 2018 Women's Asian Cup. Although she did not play in the match, Japan team won the champions for 2 tournament in a row. On June 10, she debuted as substitute midfielder from the second half against New Zealand. She played 10 games and scored 1 goal for Japan.

National team statistics

International goals
Scores and results list Japan's goal tally first.

References

External links

Japan Football Association
Albirex Niigata 

1992 births
Living people
Association football people from Kanagawa Prefecture
Japanese women's footballers
Japan women's international footballers
Nadeshiko League players
Albirex Niigata Ladies players
Women's association football midfielders
Footballers at the 2018 Asian Games
Asian Games gold medalists for Japan
Asian Games medalists in football
Medalists at the 2018 Asian Games